Scott Price may refer to:
Scott Price (cyclist) (born 1969), Canadian cyclist
Scott Price (politician) (born 1962), politician from the U.S. state of Nebraska